Burning Sun is a song and an EP made by the German power metal band Helloween taken from the album Straight Out of Hell. It was only released in Japan. A Hammond version of the title track dedicated to Jon Lord was included on the limited and Japanese editions of Straight Out of Hell as a bonus track.

Track listing

Personnel 

 Andi Deris – vocals
 Michael Weikath – lead and rhythm guitars, backing vocals
 Sascha Gerstner – lead and rhythm guitars, backing vocals
 Markus Grosskopf – bass, backing vocals
 Daniel Löble – drums

Credits
 Produced by Charlie Bauerfeind
 Recorded & mixed at Mi Sueño Studio in Tenerife, SPA
 Engineered & mixed by Charlie Bauerfeind for S.C. & Services
 Artwork by Thomas Ewerhard

Charts

References 

2012 EPs
Helloween albums